This is a list of episodes of the BBC One show DIY SOS And DIY SOS The Big Build. The first episode aired on BBC One on 7 October 1999 and it has run for 242 episodes over 32 series.

Series overview

Series 1

Series 2

Series 3

Series 4

Series 5

Series 6

Series 7

Series 8

Series 9

Series 10

Series 11

Series 12

Series 13

Series 14

Series 15

Series 16

Series 17

Series 18

Series 19

Original Special Episodes

Big Build Special Episodes 

A - Broadcast between series 22 & 23

B - Broadcast between the regular series 23 episodes, 23.6 and 23.7, but not allocated a number

C - Broadcast between the regular series 24 episodes, 24.1 and 24.2, but not allocated a number

D - Broadcast before the regular series 31 episodes

Special Look back Episodes

Series 20

Series 21

Series 22

Series 23

Series 24

Series 25

Series 26

Series 27

Series 28

Series 29

Series 30

Series 31

Series 32

References

DIY SOS